Synaphe lorquinalis is a species of moth of the family Pyralidae described by Achille Guenée in 1854. It is found in Portugal and Spain.

References

Moths described in 1854
Pyralini